Anthony Francis O'Connell Maggs (9 February 1937 in Pretoria, South Africa – 2 June 2009) was a racing driver from South Africa. He participated in 27 Formula One World Championship Grands Prix, debuting on 15 July 1961. He achieved three podiums, and scored a total of 26 championship points. He was the first South African to take part in a Formula One Grand Prix.

The son of a wealthy farmer and businessman, Tony Maggs was part of Ken Tyrrell's Formula Junior, Cooper-BMC team in 1961 and shared the European Championship with Jo Siffert. He was invited into the Cooper Formula One team for 1962–1963, finishing second in the French Grand Prix both years, but was dropped at the end of 1963.

Maggs then moved to Scuderia Centro Sud for 1964 and despite the fact that their BRM P57s were not current machinery achieved two points finishes out of three race starts. He also returned to Formula Two with an MRP Lola and with David Piper won the Kyalami 9 Hours race in the latter's Ferrari GTO.

In 1965, Maggs raced only once in Formula One, for Reg Parnell Racing, in the South African Grand Prix at East London but continued with success in both Formula Two and sports cars. However, in a national race at Pietermaritzburg he crashed his Brabham and a young spectator standing in a restricted area was hit and killed. Maggs immediately retired from motor sport to concentrate on his business interests.

Maggs died on 2 June 2009, from cancer.

Complete Formula One World Championship results
(key)

References

1937 births
2009 deaths
South African Formula One drivers
Sportspeople from Pretoria
South African racing drivers
24 Hours of Le Mans drivers
Cooper Formula One drivers
Scuderia Centro Sud Formula One drivers
Reg Parnell Racing Formula One drivers
World Sportscar Championship drivers
12 Hours of Reims drivers
Porsche Motorsports drivers